Lead! Heat! Beat! (stylized as LEAD! HEAT! BEAT!) is the third studio album by Japanese hip-hop group Lead. The album ranked No. 15 on Oricon and remained on the charts for four weeks. The album was released on August 10, 2005, nearly a year since their previous album, Brand New Era, and held three preceding singles: Tenohira wo Taiyou ni/Delighted, Atarashii Kisetsu e and Baby Running Wild.

Information
Lead! Heat! Beat! is the third studio album by four member Japanese hip-hop dance group Lead. The album took the No. 15 spot on the weekly Oricon Albums Charts and remained on the charts for four consecutive weeks. It was released a year after their previous album, Brand New Era, which had been released at the end of August 2004. Prior to its release, the album garnered three singles: the double a-side Tenohira wo Taiyou ni/Delighted, the spring ballad Atarashii Kisetsu e and the summer pop song Baby Running Wild.

As with their previous albums, the album was only released as a standard CD, not carrying a CD+DVD counterpart. Instead, the music videos were later placed on their third compilation DVD Movies 3, which was released three years later on August 6, 2008. Unlike their previous albums, Lead! Heat! Beat! was not given a limited edition version.

It became their first album to contain both a prelude and an outro, which were different renditions of "Rock the House!!". Along with the new tracks on the album, it also included a remix of "Baby Running Wild" as track #15.

On December 7, 2005, they would release their second concert DVD, which corresponding with the album: Lead Live Tour Upturn 2005.

Track listing

Charts

References

External links
 Lead Official

2005 albums
Pony Canyon albums
Lead (band) albums
Lead (band) songs